Ana María Martínez (born 1971) is a Puerto Rican soprano.

Early life
Martínez was born in San Juan, Puerto Rico; she is the daughter of Puerto Rican opera singer Evangelína Colón and Cuban psychoanalyst Ángel Martínez. Martínez' grandparents originated in Spain and France, and migrated to the Caribbean islands. Martínez grew up with a strict Catholic upbringing. She briefly attended the Boston Conservatory as a musical theater major, but dropped out and later received a bachelor's degree and a master's degree from the Juilliard School.

Career
After winning first prize in the 1994 Eleanor McCollum Competition, Martínez joined the Houston Grand Opera's studio in the 1994/95 season, during which she performed Micaëla in Carmen and the title role in Sāvitri.

In November 2005 Martínez debuted with the Metropolitan Opera in Carmen as Micaëla.
In 2006 she was featured in Salzburg Festival's production of Così fan tutte as Fiordiligi.

In February 2016 she was Cio-Cio San in Madama Butterfly at the Metropolitan Opera.

She returned to Così fan tutte as Fiordiligi at the Lyric Opera of Chicago in February 2018. In April, she took up the title role in Florencia en el Amazonas at Florida Grand Opera. In July she performed in Falstaff at the Royal Opera, London as Alice Ford. She portrayed Élisabeth de Valois in Don Carlos opening on 22 September at the Los Angeles Opera.

In January 2019 she brought performances of Florencia to Houston Grand Opera. In February she was appointed Houston Grand Opera's first-ever artistic advisor. In May she portrayed Soleá in El gato montés at Los Angeles Opera.

In 2020, she was announced to join Shepherd School of Music as a professor in the Department of Voice effective as from 1 July 2021.

Special performances
On 11 March 2016, Martínez sang Bach/Gounod's "Ave Maria" and "Pie Jesu" from Fauré's Requiem during the funeral services of Nancy Reagan.

She provided the singing voice for Monica Bellucci's character, Alessandra 'La Fiamma', in the third season of Mozart in the Jungle.

Personal life
Martínez met tenor Chad Shelton in 2000; they married and had one son. They divorced about seven years later. She has been living in Houston since December 2002.

Awards
Martínez has won prizes including the Pepita Embil Award, Operalia, and first prize at the Eleanor McCollum Awards. She won a Latin Grammy in 2001 for Classical Album for Isaac Albéniz's Merlin with Carlos Álvarez, Plácido Domingo, Jane Henschel and conductor José de Eusebio with the Orquesta Sinfónica de Madrid.
She is honored in the 15th annual Opera News Awards.

Discography 

Glass: La Belle et la Bête, Nonesuch, 1995
Sheng: The Song of Majnun – A Persian Romeo and Juliet, Delos, 1997
Albéniz: Merlin, Decca, 2000
Glass: Symphony No. 5, Nonesuch, 2000
Bacalov: Misa Tango, Deutsche Grammophon, 2000
American Dream: Andrea Bocelli's Statue of Liberty Concert, (TV/DVD) WNET/THIRTEEN, 2000
Glass: Philip on Film, (Box Set) Nonesuch, 2001
Rodrigo: 100 Años – La Obra Vocal, I y II, EMI, 2002
Rodrigo: 100 Años – La Obra Vocal, IV y V, EMI, 2002
Introducing the World of American Jewish Music for the Milken Archive of American Jewish Music, Naxos, 2003
Castelnuovo-Tedesco: Naomi and Ruth, Naxos, 2003
Spanish Night from the Berlin Waldbühne, (DVD) with Plácido Domingo and Sarah Chang, Naxos, 2003
Albéniz: Henry Clifford, Decca, 2003
Catan: Florencia en el Amazonas, Albany, 2003
Levy: Masada (Canto de Los Marranos) for the Milken Archive of American Jewish Music, Naxos, 2004
Weisgall: T'Kiatot: Rituals for Rosh Hashana, Naxos, 2004
Soprano Songs and Arias: Ana María Martínez, Naxos, 2005
American Classics – Beveridge/Marriner for the Milken Archive of American Jewish Music, Naxos, 2005
Mercurio: Many Voices, Sony, 2006
Mozart: Così fan tutte, (DVD) Decca, 2007
Leoncavallo: Pagliacci, Decca, 2007
Amor, Vida de mi Vida, (DVD) with Plácido Domingo, Euroarts, 2009
Dvorak: Rusalka, Glyndebourne, 2010
Concerto: One Night in Central Park with Andrea Bocelli (TV/DVD/CD) WNET / THIRTEEN, 2011
Manon Lescaut with Andrea Bocelli, Plácido Domingo conducting, Decca 2014

See also

List of Puerto Ricans
History of women in Puerto Rico

References

External links
Official website

1971 births
Living people
People from San Juan, Puerto Rico
Puerto Rican operatic sopranos
Grammy Award winners
Operalia, The World Opera Competition prize-winners
Juilliard School alumni
Puerto Rican people of Spanish descent
Puerto Rican people of French descent
Puerto Rican people of Cuban descent
20th-century American women  opera  singers
20th-century Puerto Rican women singers
21st-century American women opera  singers
21st-century Puerto Rican women singers